Trapezites taori, the Taori skipper or sandstone ochre, is a butterfly of the family Hesperiidae. It is found in a small area of the Blackdown Tableland in Queensland, Australia.

The wingspan is about 25 mm.

The larvae feed on Lomandra confertifolia pallida.

External links
 Australian Caterpillars

Trapezitinae
Butterflies described in 1997